The canton of Saint-Germain-Laval is a French former administrative division located in the department of Loire and the Rhône-Alpes region. It was disbanded following the French canton reorganisation which came into effect in March 2015. It consisted of 14 communes, which joined the canton of Boën-sur-Lignon in 2015. It had 5,988 inhabitants (2012).

The canton comprised the following communes:

Amions
Bully
Dancé
Grézolles
Luré
Nollieux
Pommiers
Saint-Georges-de-Baroille
Saint-Germain-Laval
Saint-Julien-d'Oddes
Saint-Martin-la-Sauveté
Saint-Paul-de-Vézelin
Saint-Polgues
Souternon

See also
Cantons of the Loire department

References

Former cantons of Loire (department)
2015 disestablishments in France
States and territories disestablished in 2015